Shane Rimmer (born Shane Lance Deacon; May 28, 1929 – March 29, 2019) was a Canadian actor and screenwriter who spent the majority of his career in the United Kingdom. The self-proclaimed "Rent-A-Yank" of the British entertainment industry, he appeared in over 160 films and television programmes from 1957 until his death in 2019, usually playing supporting North American characters.

Among his best known roles were the voice of Scott Tracy in the original Thunderbirds series, Air Force Captain "Ace" Owens in Dr. Strangelove, Joe Donnelli and Malcolm Reid on Coronation Street, Edward R. Murrow in Gandhi, and Louie Watterson on the Cartoon Network series The Amazing World of Gumball. He also made several appearances in the James Bond film series. He also made several on-stage appearances for the Royal National Theatre, and contributed scripts to Captain Scarlet and the Mysterons and Joe 90.

Early life
Rimmer was born Shane Lance Deacon in Toronto, Ontario to a British mother, Vera (née Franklin), and an Irish father, Thomas Deacon, who was a journalist. He had a younger sister, Noreen. He adopted his paternal grandmother's maiden name Rimmer and began his career on Canadian radio as a singer and disc jockey before becoming a television presenter.

Career

Film
Rimmer appeared mainly in supporting roles, especially in films and television series produced in the United Kingdom. He emigrated to England in 1959, after initially performing as a cabaret singer.

His appearances include roles in films such as Dr. Strangelove (1964), Rollerball (1975), The Spy Who Loved Me (1977), Gandhi (1982), Out of Africa (1985), Crusoe (1989), Spy Game (2001) and Batman Begins (2005).

During his career, Rimmer appeared uncredited in, among other films, You Only Live Twice (1967), The Dirty Dozen (1967), Diamonds Are Forever (1971), Star Wars (1977) and Superman II (1980). He also is believed to have provided the voice for the character Hamilton (played by Robert Dix) in Live and Let Die (1973).

Television
Rimmer had a long-running association with TV producer Gerry Anderson, including the series Thunderbirds (1964–1966). He was the voice actor behind the character of Scott Tracy. He drafted the story for the series' penultimate episode, "Ricochet" (1966), from which writer Tony Barwick penned a script. Rimmer thought the studio rates for voices in those days were "absolutely deplorable". Years after working on Thunderbirds, Rimmer, along with fellow Anderson associate Matt Zimmerman, retained a solicitor. They informed him of the sort of money they received, and the solicitor then gained Rimmer and Zimmerman an immense raise in the residuals. He also appeared in an episode of Danger Man.

He also wrote scripts and provided uncredited voices for Anderson's subsequent Supermarionation productions Captain Scarlet and the Mysterons (1967–68), Joe 90 (1968–69) and The Secret Service (1969), appeared in episodes of the live-action series UFO (1970) and The Protectors (1972–74), provided voices for Space: 1999 (1975–77), and guest-starred in one of its episodes, "Space Brain" (1976). Later, he appeared in the un-televised 1986 pilot Space Police (which was adapted as a full TV series and renamed Space Precinct in the 1990s, though Ted Shackleford replaced Rimmer for the series) and provided the voice of the title character in Dick Spanner, P.I. (1987).

Rimmer and American actor Ed Bishop—himself an Anderson associate–would joke about how their professional paths frequently crossed, calling themselves "Rent-a-Yanks". They appeared together as United States Navy sailors in The Bedford Incident (1965) and as NASA technicians in the opening of You Only Live Twice (1967), as well as touring together on stage, including a production of Death of a Salesman in the 1990s. Rimmer and Bishop also appeared in the BBC drama-documentary Hiroshima, which was completed shortly after Bishop's death in 2005.

He was the 2nd voice of Louie Watterson in the Cartoon Network series The Amazing World of Gumball from 2014 to 2019. The episode "The Agent" was his final role before his death in 2019.

Other work
Rimmer appeared once in Doctor Who (in the 1966 serial The Gunfighters), and twice in Coronation Street: as Joe Donnelli (from 1968 to 1970), who held Stan Ogden hostage before taking his own life, and Malcolm Reid (in 1988), the adoptive father of Audrey Roberts' son Stephen. Rimmer was the main character in "Alternative 3 " documentary 1977 hoax ITV Mars landing https://www.youtube.com/watch?v=Fmw1R5AsI58 He made many guest appearances in British TV series for ITV, including Roald Dahl's Tales of the Unexpected, as well as ITC's The Persuaders! In 1980, Rimmer played Edward Condon in the BBC mini-series Oppenheimer, which was rebroadcast in the United States in 1982, and appeared in the 1984 miniseries Master of the Game, opposite Dyan Cannon.

In 1989, Rimmer was reunited with Bishop and Zimmerman during the production of a BBC Radio 4 adaptation of Sir Arthur Conan Doyle's A Study in Scarlet. In 2012, he recorded a reading of Donald Cotton's Doctor Who novelisation of The Gunfighters for release in February 2013.

In 2010, Rimmer returned to the world of Thunderbirds with a 15-minute fan film simply entitled Thunderbirds 2010. He portrays Jeff Tracy in a voiceover on Thunderbird 3s radio, towards the end of the movie, instructing Scott and Alan to take the three astronauts they rescued in the movie to an intact space station, and return to Tracy Island in anticipation of a storm in the Pacific.

Rimmer played the role of Leo Carlin in the 2013 audio drama The Mighty Carlins by award-winning Canadian playwright Collin Doyle. The recording was produced by Wireless Theatre Company.

In 2014, Rimmer released his first fiction novel Long Shot, through amazon.co.uk/com. This marked his second foray into publishing, having released his autobiography From Thunderbirds to Pterodactyls four years previously.

In 2015, he played the role of "Anderson" in the science fiction short DARKWAVE: Edge of the Storm; this was released for free online the following year.

Personal life and death
Rimmer married Sheila Logan in 1963; the couple had three sons: Damien, Ben and Paul.

Rimmer died at Barnet Hospital in London on 29 March 2019, aged 89. He was survived by his wife and sons.

Selected filmography

A Dangerous Age (1957) as Nancy's Father
Flaming Frontier (1958) as Running Bear
The Day the Sky Exploded (1958) as John McLaren (voice)
Dr. Strangelove (1964) as Captain "Ace" Owens
The Bedford Incident (1965) as Seaman 1st Class
Thunderbirds Are GO (1966) as Scott Tracy (voice)
You Only Live Twice (1967) as Hawaii Radar Operator (uncredited)
The Dirty Dozen (1967) as American Soldier (uncredited)
Thunderbird 6 (1968) as Scott Tracy (voice)
The Persuaders!  (1971) as Lomax
Diamonds Are Forever (1971) as Tom (uncredited)
Baffled! (1973) as Race Track Announcer / Commentator
Scorpio (1973) as Cop in Hotel (uncredited)
Live and Let Die (1973) as Hamilton (voice, uncredited)
Take Me High (1973) (uncredited)
S*P*Y*S (1974) as Hessler
Rollerball (1975) as Rusty, Team Executive
The 'Human' Factor (1975) as Carter, CIA Man
Twilight's Last Gleaming (1977) as Colonel Alexander B. Franklin
Nasty Habits (1977) as Officer
Star Wars (1977) as Rebel Fighter Technician (uncredited)
Silver Bears (1977) as American Banker
The People That Time Forgot (1977) as Hogan
The Spy Who Loved Me (1977) as Commander Carter (USS Wayne)
Julia (1977) as Customs Officer (uncredited)
Warlords of Atlantis (1978) as Captain Daniels
The Billion Dollar Bubble (1978)
Superman (1978) as Naval Transport Commander (uncredited)
Hanover Street (1979) as Col. Ronald Barth
Arabian Adventure (1979) as Abu
Charlie Muffin (1979) as Braley
Superman II (1980) as Controller No. 2
The Dogs of War (1980) as Dr. Oaks
Priest of Love (1981) as Immigration Officer
Reds (1981) as MacAlpine
Gandhi (1982) as Commentator
The Hunger (1983) as Arthur Jelinek
Superman III (1983) as State Policeman
The Lonely Lady (1983) as Adolph Fannon
Gulag (1985) as Jay
Morons from Outer Space (1985) as Redneck (Melvin)
Reunion at Fairborough (1985) as Joe Szyluk
The Holcroft Covenant (1985) as Lieutenant Miles
Dreamchild (1985) as Mr. Marl
White Nights (1985) as Ambassador Smith
Out of Africa (1985) as Belknap
The Last Days of Patton (1986) as Dr. Col. Lawrence Ball
Anastasia: The Mystery of Anna (1986) as Harvey Coward
Whoops Apocalypse (1986) as Marvin Gelber
The Bourne Identity (1988) as Alexander Conklin
A Very British Coup (1988) as Marcus Morgan
Crusoe (1989) as Mr. Mather
A Kiss Before Dying (1991) as Commissioner Malley
Company Business (1991) as chairman, Maxine Gray Cosmetics
Year of the Comet (1992) as T.T. Kelleher
Piccolo Grande Amore (1993) as Mr Hughes
A Kid in King Arthur's Court (1995) as Coach
Space Truckers (1996) as E.J. Saggs
One of the Hollywood Ten (2000) as Parnell Thomas
Spy Game (2001) as Estate Agent
The War of the Starfighters (2003) as Tantive Base Operative (voice)
Batman Begins (2005) as Older Gotham Water Board Technician
Mee-Shee: The Water Giant (2005) as Bob Anderson
Alien Autopsy (2006) as Colonel
Lovelorn (2010) as The Barman
Dark Shadows (2012) as board member 1
Darkwave: Edge Of The Storm (2016) as Captain S. Anderson

References

External links
Shane Rimmer at the British Film Institute

Shane Rimmer in the James Bond films

1929 births
2019 deaths
Audiobook narrators
Cabaret singers
Canadian expatriate actors
Canadian expatriates in England
Canadian emigrants to the United Kingdom
Canadian male film actors
Canadian male radio actors
Canadian male stage actors
Canadian male television actors
Canadian male television writers
Canadian male voice actors
Canadian people of British descent
Canadian people of Irish descent
Canadian television writers
Male actors from Toronto
Writers from Toronto
20th-century Canadian male actors
21st-century Canadian male actors